Sirvard Emirzyan (born 5 June 1966 in Yerevan, Armenian SSR) is a former Soviet diver of Armenian descent. She was awarded the Honoured Master of Sports of the USSR title in 1980.

Sirvard started to practice diving in 1972 under the teaching of Basil Kuvshinkina. She became a Champion of the USSR in 1979 in the pole ten-meter platform, and in 1980, finished Second in the same discipline. Emirzyan, a schoolgirl at the time, competed at the 1980 Summer Olympics in Moscow as the youngest athlete on the USSR Olympic team. At the age of 14, she won an Olympic silver medal on the 10 meter platform.

References

External links
Sports-Reference.com

1966 births
Living people
Sportspeople from Yerevan
Armenian female divers
Olympic divers of the Soviet Union
Divers at the 1980 Summer Olympics
Olympic silver medalists for the Soviet Union
Olympic medalists in diving
Soviet Armenians
Medalists at the 1980 Summer Olympics